"He's Simple, He's Dumb, He's the Pilot" is a song by American indie rock band Grandaddy, released as the third single from their second studio album The Sophtware Slump (2000).

Writing and composition

Regarding the song's conception and its position as The Sophtware Slump'''s opening track, Jason Lytle noted: "It was definitely a struggle to get all the three parts to actually sound like they were intended to live together. I usually get into this space where, once the album starts to come together, I start to figure out what's missing or what needs to be added, and I realised that it really needed something like that to set it off in a certain direction. It's just a struggle putting something like that together and making it not sound forced, y’know?"

 Release 

"He's Simple, He's Dumb, He's the Pilot." was released as the third single from The Sophtware Slump. It reached number 82 in the UK Singles Chart.

 Touring 

Grandaddy toured with Elliott Smith in 2000 and he would occasionally join them onstage and sing lead vocals on parts of this song.

 Legacy 

The song was featured on the soundtrack of UK hidden camera show Trigger Happy TV and the films Jackpot (2001), The Forest for the Trees (2003), and Occupation: Dreamland'' (2005).

Actor Jason Lee has cited this song as the inspiration to name his child Pilot Inspektor.

Track listing

References

External links
 

2000 singles
Grandaddy songs
2000 songs